The Great Backerganj Cyclone of 1876 (29 October – 1 November 1876) was one of the deadliest tropical cyclones in history. It hit the coast of Backerganj, British Raj (near Meghna estuary) in present-day Barisal, Bangladesh, killing about 200,000 people, half of whom were drowned by the storm surge, while the rest died from the subsequent famine.

Meteorological history
The cyclone formed over the SE Bay of Bengal as a depression near 10.0°N and 89.0°E on 27 October, intensified into a cyclonic storm near 15.0°N and 89.0°E on 30 October and subsequently intensified into a severe cyclonic storm with a core of hurricane winds. The cyclone moved north up to the North Bay and then NNE. On 31 October, the cyclone made landfall on Backerganj.

See also

 North Indian Ocean tropical cyclone

References

1876 natural disasters
1876
1876
1876
1876 in India
1876 in British India
1876 disasters in India